Bremia is a genus of water moulds in the family Peronosporaceae.

The genus name of Bremia is in honour of Johann Jakob Bremi (1791 - 1857), a Swiss 'Kunsthandwerker' (artist wood turner) and entomologist from Zürich.

The genus was circumscribed by Eduard August von Regel in Bot. Zeitung (Berlin) Vol.1 on page 665 in 1843.

References

Peronosporales
Water mould genera